"Ozymandias" is a science fiction novella by Robert Silverberg. It was originally published in 1958 in Infinity Science Fiction.

An interstellar military expedition reaches an unknown planet, where a robot with an incredible memory is found, full of secrets.

References

External links 
  

American novellas
Short stories by Robert Silverberg
Works originally published in Infinity Science Fiction
Short stories about robots
Short stories set in the future
1958 short stories